The men's 100 metre freestyle was one of the four swimming events on the Swimming at the 1896 Summer Olympics programme. The 100 metre freestyle race was the first of the swimming events. Ten swimmers entered the race. The two competitors from Austria-Hungary finished in the top two places, though no record distinguishes the places of the other eight competitors. The names of four of the Greek swimmers are not known. Alfréd Hajós of Hungary beat Otto Herschmann of Austria by less than a body length, with the other swimmers far behind. The Hungarian flag was hoisted, but the band began to play the Austrian anthem (Gott erhalte Franz den Kaiser) until the Hungarian team sang the Hungarian anthem (Himnusz).

Background

This was the first appearance of the men's 100 metre freestyle. The event has been held at every Summer Olympics except 1900 (when the shortest freestyle was the 200 metres), though the 1904 version was measured in yards rather than metres.

Alfréd Hajós was the 1895 European champion.

Competition format

The competition involved a single race, with all swimmers competing at the same time. The swimmers were taken out by ship into the bay, where they would swim toward shore. Buoys marked the starting line, hollow pumpkins (which tended to move) marked the course, and a red flag marked the finish line.

Records

There were no recognized records in the 100 metre freestyle before this competition. World records would not be recognized until 1905. Alfréd Hajós's winning time of 1:22.2 was the initial Olympic record.

Schedule

The 100 metres freestyle was the first of the swimming events.

Results

References

  (Digitally available at )
  (Excerpt available at )
 

Men's freestyle 0100